The Melodi Grand Prix Junior 2014 was Norway's thirteenth national Melodi Grand Prix Junior for young singers aged 8 to 15. It was held in Oslo Spektrum, Oslo, Norway and broadcast live by the Norwegian Broadcasting Corporation (NRK). It was hosted by Margrethe Røed and Tooji.

The winner was 13-year-old Mathea-Mari with the song "#Online", but didn't go to Junior Eurovision.

Results

First round

Super Final
The exact number of public votes was unknown. Only the winner was announced.

References

External links
Official website

Melodi Grand Prix Junior
Music festivals in Norway